Zwar is a surname. Notable people with the surname include:

Adam Zwar (born 1972), Australian actor, voice actor and writer
Albert Zwar (1863–1935), Australian politician
Charles Zwar (1911–1989), Australian songwriter, composer, lyricist, pianist and music director
Desmond Zwar, Australian author and reporter
Henry Zwar (1873–1959), Australian politician
Traugott Bernhard Zwar (1876–1947), Australian academic, army medical officer and surgeon

See also
Kyaw Zwar Minn, Burmese diplomat